Phytoecia longicornis is a species of beetle in the family Cerambycidae. It was described by Pesarini and Sabbadini in 2009.

References

Phytoecia
Beetles described in 2009